Herman van Raalte (8 April 19213 April 2013) was a Dutch football player.

Club career
Van Raalte played for hometown club HVV Hengelo in the 1930s and 40s before joining Amsterdam side Blauw-Wit during World War II. With Blauw-Wit he lost the 1949–50 Netherlands Football League Championship final. He also played for B.V.C. Amsterdam and V.V. Leeuwarden.

International career
Van Raalte earned his one and only cap for the Netherlands in a November 1948 friendly match against Belgium.

Retirement and death
After his football career, he became a textile merchant. Van Raalte died of a bacterial infection after hip surgery on 3 April 2013 at the age of 91. He was the then oldest living former Dutch international footballer.

References

External links
 Herman van Raalte overleden - Blauw-Wit

1921 births
2013 deaths
Sportspeople from Hengelo
Association football goalkeepers
Dutch footballers
Netherlands international footballers
Blauw-Wit Amsterdam players
Footballers from Overijssel